"Abiquiu" is the eleventh episode of the third season of the American television drama series Breaking Bad, and the 31st overall episode of the series. It was written by John Shiban and Thomas Schnauz and directed by Michelle MacLaren.  The title refers to Abiquiú, New Mexico, where Georgia O'Keeffe had a home and studio.

Plot 
In a flashback, Jesse Pinkman and Jane Margolis visit the Georgia O'Keeffe Museum and view her painting My Last Door. The two debate the meaning of the painting before Jane concludes that O'Keeffe was simply trying to make a good feeling last.

In the present, Hank Schrader is frustrated with his physical therapy. Marie gives Skyler White the therapy bill to pay as they previously discussed. Walter White attempts to pay with his drug money, but Skyler insists the source must be "unimpeachable." Walt takes her to meet Saul Goodman, who laundered his money in the past. Skyler is put off by his flippant personality and his scheme to buy a laser tag facility. Instead, she suggests a more believable business investment: the car wash where Walt previously worked. Saul objects, as the owner of the laser tag facility would ask no questions about the deal, while the car wash owner, Bogdan Wolynetz, is an unknown factor. Skyler offers to help launder the money by managing the car wash. Walt worries that this would make her liable for his actions, but she reveals she never filed the divorce papers, and if married, cannot be made to testify against him.

Meanwhile, Walt warns Jesse about skimming some of their meth product, which he continues to deny doing. Jesse takes what he has stolen to a Narcotics Anonymous meeting to give to Badger Mayhew and Skinny Pete to help peddle. The two say they cannot bring themselves to sell meth to recovering addicts, so Jesse shows them how easy it is by striking up a conversation with Andrea Cantillo, a newcomer to the meetings. He soon becomes attached to Andrea while surreptitiously attempting to sell her drugs. Andrea invites him to her home, where Jesse discovers she has a son, Brock. From him, Jesse learns that she has a younger brother named Tomás, although she initially refuses to talk about him. Later, Andrea suggests they use methamphetamine, but Jesse declines now that he knows she has a child, and the two argue. Andrea insists she wants to avoid having Brock suffer from the same fate as Tomás, who, as part of an initiation to a local drug gang, shot a rival dealer at a street corner. Jesse recognizes that the murder was that of Combo a few months prior.

Gus invites Walt to his home for a private dinner, telling Walt that he made many mistakes when he first began working in the drug business. He regrets that he did not have a mentor and warns Walt never to make the same mistake twice. The next day, Jesse travels to the corner where Combo was killed. He finds Tomás there, and confirms that not only is he working for a drug gang, but the gang works for Gus peddling the blue meth that he and Walt are making. Jesse quietly walks away, enraged.

Production 
The episode was written by John Shiban and Thomas Schnauz, and directed by Michelle MacLaren; it aired on AMC in the United States and Canada on May 30, 2010.

Reception

Viewership 
The episode's original broadcast was viewed by 1.32 million people, an increase from the 1.20 million from the previous episode, "Fly".

Reviews
The episode was critically acclaimed. Seth Amitin of IGN gave the episode a rating of 8.9 out of 10 commenting: "Breaking Bad has been one of the few shows on television to have amazing story arcs and characters, not just in each episode, but in the series as a whole. "Abiquiú" was a great example of this."

Donna Bowman of The A.V. Club gave the episode an A− rating, noting "it's become increasingly obvious this season how quickly Breaking Bad has decided to move through its starting premises."

In 2019 The Ringer ranked "Abiquiú" 49th of the 62 Breaking Bad episodes.

Notes

References

External links 
"Abiquiu" at the official Breaking Bad site

2010 American television episodes
Breaking Bad (season 3) episodes